The 1905 Lehigh Brown and White football team was an American football team that represented Lehigh University as an independent during the 1905 college football season. In its fourth season under head coach Samuel B. Newton, the team compiled a 6–7 record and was outscored by a total of 201 to 154. The team played its home games at Lehigh Field in Bethlehem, Pennsylvania.

Schedule

References

Lehigh
Lehigh Mountain Hawks football seasons
Lehigh Brown and White football